Q4, Q-4 or q4 may refer to:
 The fourth quarter of a calendar year
 The fourth quarter of a fiscal year
 Q4 (New York City bus), a bus line in Queens
 Quake 4, a first-person shooter video game developed by Raven Software
Audi Q4 e-tron, a compact SUV
 Swazi Express Airways IATA airline designator
 Alfa Romeos All Wheel Drive (AWD) system
 LNER Class Q4, a class of British steam locomotives 
 The Cunard Line codename for the ship later named Queen Elizabeth 2
 A shortened name for Section 4, a part of Co-op City
 An abbreviation for "quaque four" (every four) used in medical prescriptions
 "Quran 4", the 4th chapter of the Islamic Holy book

See also
4Q (disambiguation)